The 1973 Fresno State Bulldogs football team represented California State University, Fresno as a member of the Pacific Coast Athletic Association (PCAA) during the 1973 NCAA Division I football season. Led by first-year head coach J. R. Boone, the Fresno State compiled an overall record of 2–9 with a mark of 1–3 in conference play, placing fourth in the PCAA. The Bulldogs played their home games at Ratcliffe Stadium on the campus of Fresno City College in Fresno, California.

Schedule

References

Fresno State
Fresno State Bulldogs football seasons
Fresno State Bulldogs football